Baron Masham is a title that has been created three times, once in the Peerage of Great Britain and twice in the Peerage of the United Kingdom. It was first created in the Peerage of Great Britain in 1712 when the courtier Samuel Masham was made Baron Masham, of Otes. In 1723 he also succeeded as fourth Baronet of High Lever. The barony became extinct on the death of the second Baron in 1776. The Masham baronetcy, of High Lever in the County of Essex, was created by James I in the Baronetage of England on 20 December 1621 for Samuel Masham. The third Baronet was Member of Parliament for Essex. The baronetcy became extinct along with the barony in 1776.

It was created for a second time in the Peerage of the United Kingdom in 1891, when the industrialist Samuel Lister was made Baron Masham, of Swinton in the County of York. This creation became extinct upon the death of the third Baron in 1924.

It was created for at third time in the Peerage of the United Kingdom in 1955 when the Conservative politician Philip Cunliffe-Lister, 1st Viscount Swinton, was made Baron Masham, of Ellington in the County of York. He was created Earl of Swinton at the same time. Born Philip Lloyd Grame, he was the husband of Mary Constance Cunliffe-Lister, granddaughter of the first Baron of the 1891 creation, and had assumed the surname of Cunliffe-Lister in 1924 when his wife succeeded to the substantial Masham estates. Susan Cunliffe-Lister, wife of the second Earl of Swinton, was created a life peer as Baroness Masham of Ilton in her own right in 1970.

Note: there is an older, separate title Baron Scrope of Masham that belongs to the Scrope family. It is in abeyance since 1517.

Masham baronets, of High Lever (1621)
Sir William Masham, 1st Baronet (c. 1592 – c. 1656)
Sir William Masham, 2nd Baronet (d. c. 1663)
Sir Francis Masham, 3rd Baronet (c. 1646 – 1723)
Sir Samuel Masham, 4th Baronet (c. 1679 – 1758)  (created Baron Masham in 1712)

Barons Masham, first creation (1712)
Samuel Masham, 1st Baron Masham (c. 1679 – 1758)
Samuel Masham, 2nd Baron Masham (1712–1776)

Barons Masham, second creation (1891)
Samuel Cunliffe Lister, 1st Baron Masham (1815–1906)
Samuel Cunliffe Lister, 2nd Baron Masham (1857–1917)
John Cunliffe Lister, 3rd Baron Masham (1867–1924)

Barons Masham, third creation (1955)
see Earl of Swinton

References

Kidd, Charles, Williamson, David (editors). Debrett's Peerage and Baronetage'' (1990 edition). New York: St Martin's Press, 1990.

Extinct baronies in the Peerage of Great Britain
Baronies in the Peerage of the United Kingdom
Extinct baronies in the Peerage of the United Kingdom
Noble titles created in 1712
Noble titles created in 1891
Noble titles created in 1955
Noble titles created for UK MPs